Cochylidia contumescens is a species of moth of the family Tortricidae. It was described by Edward Meyrick in 1931. It is found in China (Anhui, Guangxi, Henan, Tianjin), Korea, Japan and Russia.

The wingspan is 9−20 mm.

References

Cochylini
Moths described in 1931
Moths of Asia
Moths of Japan
Moths of Korea
Taxa named by Edward Meyrick